Pere Gratacós Boix (born 14 February 1958) is a Spanish retired football central defender and coach.

Playing career
Born in Besalú, Girona, Catalonia, Gratacós arrived at FC Barcelona's youth system in 1974 at the age of 16, going to play for several of its youth teams. He made his professional debuts with Real Valladolid in the 1979–80 season, on loan, helping to a Segunda División promotion and returning to play a further three years with Barça's reserves, where he was awarded team captaincy.

Gratacós appeared in five official games with Barcelona's first team, but never in La Liga, leaving in 1983 and joining fellow league club CA Osasuna, playing in only two games in his first year in the top flight and none whatsoever in the second. In the 1985 off-season, he returned to his native region and signed for UE Figueres in Segunda División B, helping to an immediate promotion to the second level.

Gratacós was an automatic first-choice for Figueres during his eight-year spell, when healthy – he started in all but seven of the league matches he appeared in. After suffering relegation in 1993, he retired from football at the age of 35.

Coaching career
Gratacós started coaching one year after retiring, although he had already worked with Figueres in directorial capacities. After a brief spell as an interim manager, he was in charge of two amateur teams – also in Catalonia – during four-and-a-half seasons, returning to his main club in 2001 and making history as it became the first in division three to reach the semi-finals of the Copa del Rey, eventually losing 1–2 on aggregate against Deportivo de La Coruña after previously ousting, amongst others, Barcelona and Osasuna.

Gratacós returned to Barcelona's reserves in 2003, leading them to two midtable finishes in the third tier. Subsequently, he coached the Catalonia national side in six friendly games.

In January 2010, Gratacós returned to Barcelona, being appointed director of Ciutat Esportiva Joan Gamper, the club's training ground and academy. On 13 January 2017, he was sacked after he said of Lionel Messi: "Without Iniesta, Neymar and the others, he wouldn't be such a good player".

References

External links

1958 births
Living people
People from Garrotxa
Sportspeople from the Province of Girona
Spanish footballers
Footballers from Catalonia
Association football defenders
La Liga players
Segunda División players
Segunda División B players
Tercera División players
FC Barcelona C players
FC Barcelona Atlètic players
FC Barcelona players
Real Valladolid players
CA Osasuna players
UE Figueres footballers
Spanish football managers
Segunda División B managers
UE Figueres managers
Girona FC managers
FC Barcelona Atlètic managers